Pyrgocythara emeryi is a species of sea snail, a marine gastropod mollusk in the family Mangeliidae.

Description
The length of the shell attains 6 mm.

Distribution
This marine species occurs off the Virgin Islands (?).

References

 Fargo, W. G. 1953. Pliocene Mollusca of Southern Florida. Part II. The Pliocene Turridae of Saint Petersburg, Florida Monographs of the Academy of Natural Sciences of Philadelphia 18 365–409, pls. 16–24

External links
 

emeryi
Gastropods described in 1953